The Women's 20 kilometres walk event at the 2011 World Championships in Athletics was held on a loop course starting and finishing at Gukchae - bosang Memorial Park on August 31.

Olga Kaniskina of Russia looked to continue a series of major victories which had seen her win consecutive world titles (2007, 2009), the 2008 Olympic title and a gold medal at the 2010 European Championships. Two other Russians, Vera Sokolova and Anisya Kirdyapkina, had walked the two fastest times ever for the distance that February and comprised her primary opposition. Outside of the Russians, 2009 medallists Olive Loughnane and Liu Hong were the other major medal contenders. Other entrants were Qieyang Shenjie, Li Yanfei, Beatriz Pascual, Kumi Otoshi and Vera Santos – all of whom were among the fastest walkers that year.

Records

Qualification standards

Schedule

Results

Final
Elisa Rigaudo became bronze medal on 24 March 2016 (5 years after the event) in 20 km walk (she was 4th) after disqualification of Russian Olga Kaniskina who originally had run the race. And silver in March 2019 (8 years after the event) after disqualification of Russian Anisya Kirdyapkina originally second.

References

External links
20 kilometres walk results at IAAF website

Walk 20
Racewalking at the World Athletics Championships
2011 in women's athletics